The Tang-class submarines were the first submarines designed (under project SCB 2) and built by the United States Navy after WWII. They incorporated the best features of the high-speed German Type XXI U-boat and the venerable U.S. Navy fleet submarine.  The Tang-class, with the fleet submarines converted under the Greater Underwater Propulsion Power (GUPPY) program, had much higher submerged performance than their predecessors, but were quickly surpassed by the nuclear-propelled submarines that entered service beginning in 1954. Six units in total were built.

Design
This allowed the class to take advantage of deeper ocean conditions to evade sonar, as well as maneuver more safely at moderate depths.

An unsuccessful innovation of the Tang design was the General Motors EMD 16-338 lightweight, compact, high-speed "pancake" engine, rated at 1,000 bhp. Very different from the classic diesel engines that nearly all preceding submarines used, which were laid out with a horizontal crankshaft, this new engine had a vertical crankshaft, and the cylinders were arranged radially like an aircraft engine. The goal was to reduce overall length, as testing had shown that shorter submarines were more maneuverable, especially in depth, and had less submerged drag. Four compact Guppy-type 126-cell lead–acid batteries were installed to provide a high sustained submerged speed. The overall design allowed for a  top speed and possible future propulsion replacement with a Type XVII U-boat-derived hydrogen peroxide turbine, closed-cycle diesel system, or even a nuclear power plant. However, attempts to develop the first two systems were unsuccessful, and nuclear power plants proved too large to be accommodated in the Tang-class hull.

When the boats went to sea in the early 1950s, the new engines did not work well. Their compact, high-speed design made them difficult to maintain, and they tended to leak oil into their generators. In 1956, the Navy decided to replace the pancake engines with three ten-cylinder Fairbanks-Morse opposed-piston 38D 8-1/8 diesels. To accommodate the larger engines, the boats had to be lengthened some nine feet in the engine room (three additional frames between frames 69 and 70). Accordingly, in 1957 and 1958, the first four Tangs were lengthened, while Gudgeon and Harder, still on the ways, were built to the new length with the new engines. This propulsion plant was used for almost all subsequent US conventional submarines.

The torpedo tubes were also redesigned. The six forward tubes now used air-powered piston ejection pumps, which forced a slug of water through a slide valve behind the torpedo to push it out, rather than the pulse of air used in previous designs. Because this design is somewhat quieter and does not release an air bubble every time a torpedo is fired, it has been used in all subsequent submarine designs throughout the world. The four stern tubes of previous classes were reduced to two shorter, simpler tubes that could not accommodate the longer anti-ship torpedoes and had no capability to actively eject torpedoes. Rather, they were designed for the Mark 27 and planned Mark 37 swim-out torpedoes.

Ships in class
In October 1946, the first two boats were ordered.  was built at Portsmouth Naval Shipyard;  at the Electric Boat yard in Groton, Connecticut. They are named for six US submarines lost during World War II, of which most of their commanding officers were killed in action while combating Japanese surface vessels.

In 1967, Tang, Wahoo, Gudgeon, and Harder received an additional 15-foot section (five additional frames between frames 42 and 43) to accommodate the BQG-4 Passive Underwater Fire Control Feasibility System (PUFFS) passive ranging sonar installation, with three tall domes added topside, and additional fire control equipment that enabled the use of the Mark 45 nuclear torpedo. This left the boats similar in size and capability to the GUPPY III conversions.

Museum ships
Two boats of this class, TCG Pirireis (ex-Tang) and TCG Hizirreis (ex-Gudgeon), are preserved as museum ships in Turkey.  Pirireis is at the İnciraltı Sea Museum in İzmir, and Hizirreis is at the Kocaeli Museum Ships Command in Izmit.

References

Citations

Sources
 Blackman, Raymond V.B. Jane's Fighting Ships 1971–72. London: Sampson Low, Marston & Co., 1971. .
 Gardiner, Robert and Chumbley, Stephen, Conway's All the World's Fighting Ships 1947–1995, London: Conway Maritime Press, 1995. .
 NavSource.org Postwar Diesel Submarines photo gallery index
 

Submarine classes
 
 Tang
 Tang
Radial diesel engines